Jamie Masson (born 5 April 1993) is a Scottish professional footballer who most recently played with Cove Rangers. Masson has previously played for Aberdeen, Formartine United, Elgin City and Brechin City.

Club career

Masson made his Aberdeen debut in a 3–0 defeat to Dunfermline Athletic on 28 April 2012. Masson scored his first senior goal for the club when he found the net for Aberdeen against Kilmarnock on 5 May 2012. On 8 January 2014, Masson signed for Scottish League Two side Elgin City on a loan deal until the end of the 2013–14 season.

On 28 August 2014, Masson joined Brechin City on loan until January 2015. On 23 March 2015, he signed for Brechin on loan again until the end of the 2014–15 season. Masson was released by Aberdeen at the end of the season.

On 2 October 2015, Masson joined Formartine United.

On 26 January 2023, after enjoying much success with Cove Rangers, having been a part of their rise from the 5th-tier Highland League up to the 2nd-tier Scottish Championship, Masson left the Toonsers by mutual consent in order to realise a life-long ambition to emigrate to Australia.

Style of play
Masson is a central midfielder. His former Aberdeen manager Craig Brown described him as being, "a big, strong midfield player" and compared him to Jim Bett.

References

External links

1993 births
Living people
People from Fraserburgh
Association football midfielders
Scottish footballers
Aberdeen F.C. players
Scottish Premier League players
Elgin City F.C. players
Scottish Professional Football League players
Brechin City F.C. players
Formartine United F.C. players
Highland Football League players
Footballers from Aberdeenshire
Cove Rangers F.C. players